The Loko (IPA: Lɔkɔ) are one of the indigenous ethnic groups in Sierra Leone. Landogo is used as an endonym for the people and language, but other groups refer to them as Loko.  They speak a Southwestern Mande language that is also called Loko. The majority of the Loko people live in the Northern Province of the country, particularly in Bombali District , and around the capital city of Freetown in communities such as Regent. Important regional towns include Tambiama, Kalangba, and Gbendembu, though other groups such as the Mandingo, Fula and Temne peoples live there too.

The Loko belong to the larger group of Mande peoples who live throughout West Africa. The Loko are mostly farmers and hunters. Loko believe that most humanistic and scientific power is passed down through the secret societies, such as the Kpangbani.

The Loko people also utilize practices of the Bondo secret society which aims at gradually but firmly  establishing attitudes related to adulthood in girls, discussions on fertility, morality and proper sexual comportment. The society also maintains an interest in the well-being of its members throughout their lives.

Notable Loko

Sheik I. Kamara, member of parliament of Sierra Leone
Bai Kelfa Sankoh, paramount chief of Kambia District
Ibrahim Sesay, member of parliament from Kambia District

References

 Fyle, C. (2006). Historical Dictionary of Sierra Leone.
 Babaev, K. (2010). Person Marking in South-West Mande Languages. A Tentative Reconstruction, 1–46.
 Babaev, K. (2011). On the Origins of Southwest Mande Ethnonyms, 1–3.
 Hyman, L. M. (1973). Notes on the History of Southwestern Mande. Studies in African linguistics, 4(2).
 Speed, C. K. (1991). Swears and swearing among Landogo of Sierra Leone: aesthetics, adjudication, and the philosophy of power.

 
Ethnic groups in Sierra Leone
Female genital mutilation
Female genital mutilation by country